BBC Punjabi (in Punjabi: ਬੀਬੀਸੀ ਪੰਜਾਬੀ (Gurmukhi), بی بی سی پنجابی (Shahmukhi)) or BBC News Punjabi is an international news service in Punjabi language. It was started on 2 October 2017. The service is on websites and social networking sites. The launch is part of the World Service's biggest expansion since the 1940s, following a government funding boost announced in 2016.

Broadcast area

Target audiences are Punjabis from India, Pakistan and other western countries with significant Punjabi population like Canada, Britain and Australia. According to BBC' s official website Punjabi language spoken by 100 million people, the 11th most used language in the world.

See also 

 List of Punjabi media
 List of Punjabi-language television channels

External links
 BBC Punjabi (Gurmukhi) website
 BBC News Punjabi on YouTube

References

BBC World News shows
BBC News
British Indian mass media
British Pakistani mass media
Mass media in Punjab, India
Punjabi-language television channels
Punjabi-language television channels in India
Punjabi-language television channels in Pakistan
Punjabi
Radio stations established in 2017
Television channels and stations established in 2017